Voice of Lebanon (Arabic  , French as  or VDL) is a private radio station in Lebanon, owned by the Kataeb Party since 1958. In December 2010, two rival Lebanese radio stations using the same name ran at the same time, but later in 2020, the Kataeb Party claimed back the rights for the radio it founded.

History
Voice of Lebanon was established by the Lebanese Kataeb Party (Phalanges) in 1958 during the 1958 Lebanon crisis. One of the founders was Joseph Abu Khalil, a politician from the Kataeb Party. It broadcast for a few months then ceased with the departure of Lebanese President Camille Chamoun and the arrival of President Fouad Chehab.

With the onslaught of the Lebanese Civil War, the station resumed its work in 1975, with the help of Ibrahim El Khoury (ex-chairman), Joseph El-Hachem, And Elie Saliby; initially using the medium wave and later also broadcasting on FM.

Since December 2010, it is the name of two rival Lebanese radio stations using the same name, one run by the Kataeb Party and the other by the Lebanese government. 

In 2020, the Kataeb Party reclaims the name Voice of Lebanon Radio after the court's decision.

The two separate stations
In December 1, 2010, two radio stations were operating under the same name:
Voice of Lebanon 1 

 Owner: Kataeb Party
Through  Société Nouvelle d'Information S.A.L. 
 Frequencies: 100.3 MHz and 100.5 MHz

 Broadcasting from: Ashrafieh, Beirut 
Sub-title: Voice of Freedom and Dignity ""

Voice of Lebanon 2  (Now Voice of All Lebanon)

 Owner: Independent non-partisan
Through  ""
Frequency: 93.3 MHz, alternatives: 93.1 MHz, 93.6 MHz

 Broadcasting from: Dbayeh, Matn District north of Beirut

Renaming
 
The independent station on 93.3/93.1 MHz/93.8 MHz, after losing the legal battle over the name "Voice of Lebanon" (in Arabic  pronounced ) decided to change its name to Voice of All Lebanon (in Arabic  pronounced ) to differentiate itself from the one run by Kataeb Party on 100.3 MHz/100.5 MHz which kept the original name Voice of Lebanon. 

The renaming remained controversial because of similarity of Voice of All Lebanon with Voice of Lebanon. The Kataeb Party has obtained new ruling from the courts to forbid the renamed station from the new name as well to force it to use another more distinct name.

References

External links
Voice of Lebanon 100.3 /100.5 Official website / Official Sawt Lebnan website
Voice of Lebanon 93.3 Official website

Radio stations in Lebanon